Linares is a town and municipality in the Nariño Department, Colombia.

Among the products of this municipality are panela which is obtained from sugar cane.

References

Municipalities of Nariño Department